The 1946 Xavier Gold Rush football team was an American football team that represented Xavier University of Louisiana in the Southern Intercollegiate Athletic Conference during the 1946 college football season. the team compiled a 4–2 record and outcored opponents by a total of 96 to 77. They were ranked in a tie for No. 12 among the nation's black college football teams according to the Pittsburgh Courier and its Dickinson Rating System.

Schedule

References

Xavier
Xavier Gold Rush football seasons
Xavier Gold Rush football